Hymenobacter gelipurpurascens  is a bacterium from the genus of Hymenobacter which has been isolated from soil from Alberta in Canada.

References

External links
Type strain of Hymenobacter gelipurpurascens at BacDive -  the Bacterial Diversity Metadatabase	

gelipurpurascens
Bacteria described in 2006